Zira Football Club is an Azerbaijani professional football club based in Zirə, Baku. The club competes in the Azerbaijan Premier League.

History
The club was established in 2014 and immediately joined the Azerbaijan First Division.

Despite finishing 2nd in its inaugural season in the Azerbaijan Premier League, the club wasn't allowed to compete in the UEFA Europa League.

On 27 December 2016, Adil Shukurov had his contract as manager terminated by mutual consent, with Aykhan Abbasov taking over as manager until the end of the 2016–17 season.

Aykhan Abbasov resigned as manager on 29 August 2018, with Samir Abbasov being announced as his replacement the same day.

On 8 October 2019, Abbasov left Zira by mutual consent, with Zaur Hashimov being appointed as manager until the end of the season the following day.

On 17 July 2020, Rashad Sadygov was announced as Zira's new manager on a three-year contract.

Domestic history

European history

Notes
 1QR: First qualifying round
 2QR: Second qualifying round
 3QR: Third qualifying round
 POR: Play-off round
 Group: Group stage

Stadium 

Zira's home ground is the Zira Olympic Sport Complex Stadium, which has a capacity of 1,300.

Players

Current squad

For recent transfers, see Transfers summer 2022.

Out on loan

Coaching staff

Club records

Top goalscorers

Most appearances

Managerial statistics
Information correct as of match played 15 March 2023. Only competitive matches are counted.

Notes:

References

External links 
 PFL
 Official Website 

 
Football clubs in Azerbaijan
2014 establishments in Azerbaijan
Association football clubs established in 2014